Low light, lowlights, or Low Light may refer to
 Another term for dimness
 Darkening strands of hair, the opposite of hair highlights
 "Low Light" (Pearl Jam song)
 "Low Light", a song by Idlewild from the album Hope Is Important
 Low-Light (G.I. Joe), a fictional character in the G.I. Joe universe
 "Low Lights", a song by Kanye West

See also
 Low light level television
 Low-light photography
 Night photography